Hyndland railway station serves Hyndland in Glasgow, Scotland. It is managed by ScotRail.

The station was opened by British Railways as part of the electrification of the North Clyde Lines on 5 November 1960, replacing a nearby Hyndland (Stobcross Railway) railway station which was located at the end of a short branch line from Partickhill. This was subsequently adapted for use as an EMU maintenance depot, but eventually closed in 1987. The branch has since been lifted and the site redeveloped.

The lines of the old Lanarkshire and Dunbartonshire Railway (now closed) passed under the east end of the station in a tunnel adjacent to their  station. Immediately to the west of the station is Hyndland East Junction where the Yoker and Singer (including the Milngavie branch) lines diverge.

Hyndland station is accessible from the surrounding areas of Hyndland, Broomhill and Hughenden and also serves the nearby Gartnavel General Hospital, Gartnavel Royal Hospital and Glasgow Homoeopathic Hospital.

In 2017, a local domestic cat became associated with the station.

Services 
Hyndland station is on a busy section of the Strathclyde rail network, served by all services on the Argyle Line and North Clyde Line.

2014/15 (From 9 December 2014) 
There are a total of 14 trains per hour, off-peak (daytime), in each direction.
2 tph Dalmuir to Larkhall, via Yoker
2 tph  to Dalmuir, via  and Yoker (one of which starts back from Cumbernauld and runs via )
2 tph Milngavie to Motherwell, via Hamilton (alternate trains continuing to Cumbernauld)
2 tph Whifflet to Milngavie (alternate trains starting back from Motherwell) 
2 tph Dalmuir to Whifflet, via Singer (alternate trains continuing to Motherwell)

In the evenings, services on the Argyle line continue to run as above, but the North Clyde line is reduced to:

2 tph Cumbernauld to and from Balloch, via Singer
2 tph Edinburgh Waverley to and from Helensburgh Central, via Yoker

On Sundays, there is a simplified service pattern in operation with half-hourly services on the following routes:

Helensburgh Central to and from Edinburgh Waverley via Singer
Balloch to and from Rutherglen via Yoker (services on this route then proceed alternately to Motherwell via Whifflet or to Larkhall)
Milngavie to and from Motherwell via Hamilton.

There is no direct service to Springburn or Cumbernauld, but connections are available (once per hour) at Partick.

2016 

References

Bibliography

External links

Railscot - Hyndland

Railway stations in Glasgow
Railway stations opened by British Rail
Railway stations in Great Britain opened in 1960
SPT railway stations
Railway stations served by ScotRail